Kuningan is a town and district located in eastern West Java, Indonesia, between Cirebon and Tasikmalaya, about 200 km east of Jakarta. It is the administrative center of Kuningan Regency. The district is located east of Mount Cereme/Ciremai (3.078 m), the highest mountain in West Java. The eastern part of the district is a valley. The district's landmark is a statue of a horse, called Kuda Kuningan and its motto is Kuningan Aman (Safe) Sehat (Healthy) Rindang (Leafy) Indah (Beautiful), abbreviated as Kuningan ASRI.

Administrative divisions
Kuningan District is divided into 16 villages which are as follows:

Ancaran
Awirarangan
Cibinuang
Cigintung
Cijoho
Ciporang
Cirendang
Citangtu
Karangtawang
Kasturi
Kedungarum
Kuningan
Padarek
Purwawinangun
Winduhaji
Windusengkahan

Climate
Kuningan has a tropical monsoon climate (Am) with moderate rainfall from June to September and heavy to very heavy rainfall from October to May.

References

Kuningan Regency
Populated places in West Java
Regency seats of West Java